Live at Maybeck Recital Hall, Volume Sixteen is a solo piano album by Hank Jones, recorded at the Maybeck Recital Hall in Berkeley, California.

Reception

The album was positively reviewed by Richard S. Ginell at AllMusic, who wrote that the album was "one of the most musical, and certainly one of the most enjoyable, concerts" in Concord's Maybeck Hall recital series, and wrote that Jones "always chooses his notes with care while rarely losing touch with the pulse of jazz, which is all too tempting in a solo format." Pianist Liam Noble described the performance of "'Round Midnight": "Tiny variations in voicing, placement and colour just seem to jump out... at times the lead line sounds almost quieter than the accompaniment and yet draws your ear straight to it."

Track listing 
 Introduction - 0:14
 "I Guess I'll Have to Change My Plan" (Howard Dietz, Arthur Schwartz) - 3:15 
 "It's the Talk of the Town" (Jerry Livingston, Al J. Neiburg, Marty Symes) - 3:47
 "The Very Thought of You" (Ray Noble) - 5:00 
 "The Night We Called It a Day" (Tom Adair, Matt Dennis) - 3:20
 "Bluesette" (Norman Gimbel, Toots Thielemans) - 3:07
 "A Child Is Born" (Thad Jones) - 4:37
 "What Is This Thing Called Love?" (Cole Porter) - 3:34
 "Oh, What a Beautiful Morning" (Oscar Hammerstein II, Richard Rodgers) - 5:04
 "Six and Four" (Hank Jones) - 3:43
 "I Cover the Waterfront" (Johnny Green, Edward Heyman) - 4:20
 "Memories of You" (Eubie Blake, Andy Razaf) - 4:24
 Introduction - 0:14
 "Blue Monk" (Thelonious Monk) - 4:44
 "'Round Midnight" (Bernie Hanighen, Monk, Cootie Williams) - 5:06
 Introduction - 0:19
 "Oh! Look at Me Now" (Joe Bushkin, John DeVries) - 4:38

Personnel 
 Hank Jones – piano
 Kent Judkins - art direction
 Phil Edwards - assembly
 Barbara Fisher - assistant engineer
 Nick Phillips - assistant producer
 David Luke - engineer
 Leonard Feather - liner notes
 George Horn - mastering
 James Gudeman - photography
 Carl Jefferson - producer
 John Burk - production coordination
 Bud Spangler - remote recording coordinator

References

1992 live albums
Hank Jones live albums
Concord Records live albums
Albums produced by Carl Jefferson
Albums recorded at the Maybeck Recital Hall
Solo piano jazz albums